The Vermont Building is a historic building at 10 Thacher Street in the North End neighborhood of Boston, Massachusetts.  The six-story brick and marble building was designed by Arthur Bowdith and Edward Stratton and built in 1904.  Its construction was funded by Redfield Proctor, a United States senator from Vermont, and one of the owners of the Vermont Marble Company.  It originally housed retail establishments on the ground floor, and commercial, warehousing, and light manufacturing facilities on the upper floors, including facilities of the Vermont Marble Company.  It now contains loft apartments.

The building was listed on the National Register of Historic Places in 1984.

See also 
 National Register of Historic Places listings in northern Boston, Massachusetts

References

Buildings and structures completed in 1904
Commercial buildings on the National Register of Historic Places in Massachusetts
Buildings and structures in Boston
North End, Boston
National Register of Historic Places in Boston
1904 establishments in Massachusetts